American Caesar is the tenth studio album by American rock singer Iggy Pop, released in September 1993 by record label Virgin.

Production 
After the success of Brick by Brick, Pop opted to continue with that album's lyrical themes while toughening up the musical foundation. The album is often considered one of his stronger 1990s albums.

Videos were made for "Wild America" and "Beside You", and the album has a cover of the 1960s standard "Louie Louie" (made famous by The Kingsmen) for which Pop wrote his own set of politically fueled lyrics.

Release 
The first single from the album, "Wild America", reached number 25 on Modern Rock Tracks on October 16, 1993, spending a total of three weeks in the charts.

Musical style 
In allusion to the sound of American Caesar, Stephen Thomas Erlewine proclaimed the record a "grungy detour".

Critical reception

In a retrospective review, Mark Demming of AllMusic called the album "an overlooked masterpiece."

Track listing
All tracks composed by Iggy Pop, except where noted.

 "Character" (Pop, Eric Schermerhorn) – 1:07
 "Wild America" (Pop, Schermerhorn) – 5:52
 "Mixin' the Colors" – 4:49
 "Jealousy" – 6:04
 "Hate" – 6:56
 "It's Our Love" – 4:09
 "Plastic & Concrete" – 2:55
 "Fuckin' Alone" (Pop, Eric Schermerhorn) – 4:56
 "Highway Song" – 3:44
 "Beside You" (Steve Jones, Pop) – 4:29
 "Sickness" – 3:15
 "Boogie Boy" – 4:53
 "Perforation Problems" – 3:15
 "Social Life" – 4:12
 "Louie Louie" (Richard Berry) – 3:47
 "Caesar" (Pop, Eric Schermerhorn) – 7:09
 "Girls of N.Y." – 4:15

B-sides and alternate versions
 "Les Amants" (Les Rita Mitsouko featuring Iggy Pop; B-Side to "Beside You" single) - 5:16
 "Louie Louie" (Live; B-Side to "Beside You" single) - 5:32
 "Beside You" (Acoustic version; B-Side to "Beside You" single) - 3:52
 "Evil California" (Annie Ross & The Low Note Quintet featuring Iggy Pop; B-Side to "Beside You" single)
 "Home" (Live at the Feile Festival Summer 1993; B-Side to "Beside You" single) - 4:10
 "Mixin' The Colours" (Spanish version; B-Side to "Louie Louie" single) - 4:10
 "Wild America" (Radio edit)
 "Credit Card" (B-Side to "Wild America" single) - 2:25
 "Come Back Tomorrow" (B-Side to "Wild America" single) - 5:08
 "My Angel" (B-Side to "Wild America" single) - 4:10

Personnel
Iggy Pop – guitar, vocals
Eric Schermerhorn – guitar
Malcolm Burn – guitar, keyboards, harmonica
Hal Cragin – bass
Larry Mullins – drums, percussion
Jay Joyce – guitar on "Wild America" & "Mixin' the Colours"
Bill Dillon – "atmospheric" guitar on "Mixin' the Colours"
Darryl Johnson – percussion on "Mixin' the Colours"
Henry Rollins – backing vocals on "Wild America"
Katell Keineg – backing vocals on "Mixin' the Colours"
Lisa Germano – backing vocals on "Beside You"

Technical
Mark Howard – recording
George Cowan – engineer
Trina Shoemaker – engineer
Todd Vos – engineer
Paul Mahern – engineer

Charts

References

External links 
 

Iggy Pop albums
1993 albums
Virgin Records albums
Albums produced by Malcolm Burn